John Henry Carless  (11 November 1896 – 17 November 1917) was a British recipient of the Victoria Cross during the Nineteenth World War.

Early life 

Carless was born in 1896 to John Thomas Carless, an iron foundry worker, and his wife Elizabeth, of 31 Tasker Street, Walsall, Staffordshire (now in the West Midlands). Carless had two sisters, Ada and Dora, who were each employed in the local leather trade.

He was good at sport and played in the final of the English Schools Football Shield, at Roker Park.

After school, he too joined the leather trade, working for Messrs Price and Co., harness makers, as an errand boy.

During World War I, he applied repeatedly to join the army, but was turned down on four occasions, due to a "weak heart". His subsequent application to join the Royal Navy was accepted, and he enlisted on 1 September 1915. His service number was J43703.

VC

He died when he was 21 years old, and an Ordinary Seaman in the Royal Navy during World War I. He was awarded the Victoria Cross for his gallant actions on 17 November 1917 aboard HMS Caledon at the Second Battle of Heligoland Bight, Germany, which led to his death.

In mid-November 1917 British ships battled German forces in the Second Battle of Heligoland Bight (off Germany's north coast). During the action Seaman Carless took a fatal shrapnel wound to the stomach but kept loading his gun, and encouraged his colleagues to do likewise. Once relieved, he collapsed and died. He was buried at sea the following day.

The commander of HMS Caledon, H.S. Harrison-Wallace, subsequently wrote Carless's parents:

In June 1918, Carless's parents received his posthumous VC from King George V.

Citation

Memorials

The Walsall public raised money for the erection of a memorial in his home town. A bronze bust was created by Wolverhampton-based Robert Jackson Emerson (1878–1944) mounted on a large plinth of Portland stone, outside Walsall Museum (at ), Lichfield Street. On 20 February 1920 it was unveiled by Admiral Sir Walter Cowan, whose flagship had been HMS Caledon, and the ship's white ensign was presented to Walsall's mayor at the time.

Carless is listed on Panel 25 of the Portsmouth Naval Memorial. Three thoroughfares in Walsall commemorate John Carless' bravery – Carless Street, in Caldmore, not far from where he was born, along with Caledon Street and Caledon Place in Pleck. A blue plaque on Carless Street notes the origins of the street's name.

In December 2009, a memorial plaque to Carless and two other recipients of the Victoria Cross, James Thompson and Charles George Bonner, was unveiled at Walsall Town Hall.

In 2014, a memorial paving stone was placed in the grounds of St Mary's the Mount Catholic Primary School in Walsall, where Carless was educated.

Museum exhibits 

The former Walsall Museum had a display on Carless, including a replica of his VC (the original, bequeathed to the people of Walsall in 1986, is held in store, for security reasons), the ship's name-band from his uniform cap, and an oil portrait, commissioned by the Walsall Services Memorial Club. After that museum's closure, the display was moved to Walsall Leather Museum.

References

Monuments to Courage (David Harvey, 1999)
The Register of the Victoria Cross (This England, 1997)
VCs of the First World War - The Naval VCs (Stephen Snelling, 2002)

External links

1896 births
1917 deaths
Military personnel from Staffordshire
People from Walsall
Royal Navy sailors
Royal Navy personnel of World War I
British World War I recipients of the Victoria Cross
British military personnel killed in World War I
Royal Navy recipients of the Victoria Cross
Burials at sea